Nationality words link to articles with information on the nation's poetry or literature (for instance, Irish or France).

Events

Works published

 Ludovico Ariosto, Orlando Furioso, earliest published version (see also 1532), Italy
 Robert Fabyan, Chronicle, London: Richard Pynson, publisher; Great Britain
 Baptista Mantuanus, Italian poet writing in Latin published in France:
 Agellaria
 De sacris diebus, 12 books, explaining the various saints' days of the church calendar, published in Lyon
 Garcia de Resende, editor, Cancioneiro Geral ("General Songbook"), anthology, Portugal

Births
 March 26 – Konrad Gesner (died 1565), Swiss, German-language naturalist, bibliographer and poet
 April 23 – Georg Fabricius (died 1571), German poet, historian and archaeologist
 unknown - Ou Daren (died 1596 in poetry), Ming dynasty poet and scholar.

Death
 March 22 – Baptista Mantuanus, also known as "Battista Mantovano" and "Johannes Baptista Spagnolo" (born 1447), Italian Carmelite reformer, humanist and Latin-language poet
 Ugolino Verino (born 1438), Italian, Latin-language poet

See also
 Poetry
 16th century in poetry
 16th century in literature
 Frenh Renaissance literature

 Grands Rhétoriqueurs
 Renaissance literature
 Spanish Renaissance literature

Notes

16th-century poetry
Poetry